The women's artistic team final  at the 2019 Pan American Games was held on July 27 at the Polideportivo Villa el Salvador in Lima, Peru. This event also served as the qualification for the all-around and event finals.

Schedule
All times are Peru Time (UTC-5).

Results

Team
Oldest and youngest competitors

Source:

Qualification

Individual all-around

Source:

Vault

Source:

Uneven bars

Source:

Balance beam

Source:

Floor

Source:

References

Gymnastics at the 2019 Pan American Games
Pan American Games 2019